The Paramotor Performance M3 is a family of Swedish paramotors that was designed and produced by Paramotor Performance of Bandhagen for powered paragliding. The aircraft are supplied complete and ready-to-fly.

Design and development
The M3 series was designed to comply with the US FAR 103 Ultralight Vehicles rules as well as European regulations. They all feature a paraglider-style wing, single-place accommodation and a single  Solo 210 engine in pusher configuration with a 2.4:1 ratio reduction drive and a  diameter four-bladed composite propeller. The aircraft is built from a combination of aluminium and steel and the workmanship has been noted as of high quality by reviews. All models have low hang points.

As is the case with all paramotors, take-off and landing is accomplished by foot. Inflight steering is accomplished via handles that actuate the canopy brakes, creating roll and yaw.

Variants
M3T
M3X

Specifications (M3T)

References

External links

M3
1990s Swedish ultralight aircraft
Single-engined pusher aircraft
Paramotors